Donji Vaganac  is a village in Croatia. It is connected by the D217 highway.

Populated places in Lika-Senj County